Joaquin Lopez (born 6 January 1995) is an Argentine professional footballer who last played for Geylang International in the S.League. He plays as an attacker.

Youth career
At the age of 18, Lopez made his professional footballing debut on 23 February 2014. He was influential in the match and played the full 90 minutes despite the Eagles losing 2–1 to Warriors.

Joaquin Lopez was being scouted by the club during a tour to Argentina, and he was one of the three Argentine footballers that joined Geylang International on the same day.

Lopez finally scored his first professional goal in his career, which turned out to be an important header as it drew the Eagles level on aggregate in the 2014 Singapore Cup quarter-finals.

References

1995 births
Living people
Argentine footballers
Expatriate footballers in Singapore
Expatriate sportspeople in Singapore
Argentine expatriate footballers
Association football forwards
Geylang International FC players